"Tell Me" is a song by German recording artist Sandy. Written by frequent contributors Niclas Molinder, Joacim Persson, and Pelle Ankarberg from Swedish production team Twin, the pop ballad was recorded for her debut solo album, Unexpected (2004). Production was helmed by Stefan Kuhla under his pseudonym S. Kula. Released as the album's second single, "Tell Me" reached number 10 on the German Singles Chart, becoming Sandy's second consecutive top ten entry. A different version, chiefly produced by Twin, was recorded by Swedish singer Charlotte Perrelli for her third album Gone Too Long, also released in 2004.

Track listings

Credits and personnel

 Jeo – mixing
 Joje Lindskog – drums

 Sandy Mölling – vocals
 S. Kula – production, arrangement

Charts

Weekly charts

References

2004 singles
2004 songs
Polydor Records singles
Songs written by Niclas Molinder
Songs written by Joacim Persson